The iris dilator muscle (pupil dilator muscle, pupillary dilator, radial muscle of iris, radiating fibers), is a smooth muscle of the eye, running radially in the iris and therefore fit as a dilator. The pupillary dilator consists of a spokelike arrangement of modified contractile cells called myoepithelial cells. These cells are stimulated by the sympathetic nervous system. When stimulated, the cells contract, widening the pupil and allowing more light to enter the eye.

Structure

Innervation
It is innervated by the sympathetic system, which acts by releasing noradrenaline, which acts on α1-receptors. Thus, when presented with a threatening stimulus that activates the fight-or-flight response, this innervation contracts the muscle and dilates the pupil, thus temporarily letting more light reach the retina.

The dilator muscle is innervated more specifically by postganglionic sympathetic nerves arising from the superior cervical ganglion as the sympathetic root of ciliary ganglion. From there, they travel via the internal carotid artery through the carotid canal to foramen lacerum. They then enter the middle cranial fossa above foramen lacerum, travel through the cavernous sinus in the middle cranial fossa and then travel with the ophthalmic artery in the optic canal or on the ophthalmic nerve through the superior orbital fissure. From there, they travel with the nasociliary nerve and then the long ciliary nerve. They then pierce the sclera, travel between sclera and choroid to reach the iris dilator muscle. They will also pass through ciliary ganglion and travel in short ciliary nerves to reach the iris dilator muscle.

Function

The pupillary dilator acts to increase the size of the pupil to allow more light to enter the eye. It works in opposition to the pupillary constrictor. Pupil dilation occurs when there is insufficient light for the normal function of the eye, and during heightened sympathetic activity, for example in the "fight-or-flight reflex".

History

Etymology
The English name dilator pupillae muscle as currently used in the list of English equivalents of the Terminologia Anatomica, the reference-work of the official anatomic nomenclature, can be considered as a corruption of the full Latin expression musculus dilatator pupillae. The full Latin expression exhibits three words that each can be traced back to Roman antiquity. The Classical Latin name musculus is actually a diminutive of the Classical Latin name mus, and can be translated as little mouse. In the medical writings of Aulus Cornelius Celsus we can also find this specific name to refer to a muscle instead of its literal meaning. Latin musculus can be explained by the fact that a muscle looks like a little mouse that moves under the skin. In the writings of Greek philosopher Aristotle the Ancient Greek word for mouse, i.e. μῦς is also used to refer to a muscle.

Dilatator in the Latin expression musculus dilatator pupillae is derived from the classical Latin verb dilatare, to dilate, to spread out. Two possible explanations exist concerning the etymological derivation of this verb. The first explanation considers dilatare as frequentative of differere. The Latin verb differe can mean, to carry different ways, to spread abroad, to scatter, but also to delay. The other explanation considers dilatare as a compound from di- and latus, with the latter word meaning, broad or wide, hence the German name Erweiterer for Latin dilatator.

The expression dilator pupillae muscle, as used in the list of English equivalents of the Terminologia Anatomica, is actually partly Latin, i.e. dilator pupillae, with pupillae (=of the pupil), a noun in the genitive case modifying dilator, a noun in the nominative case, and partly English, i.e. muscle. In previous editions (Nomina Anatomica) this muscle was officially called the musculus dilator pupillae, The Nomina Anatomica as authorized in 1895 in Basle and in 1935 in Jena used the full Latin expression.

Additional images

See also
 Iris sphincter muscle
 Mydriasis
 Pupillary response

References

External links
 Description of function at tedmontgomery.com
 Slide at mscd.edu
 

Muscular system
Human iris